The LXII Army Corps, initially known as the LXII Reserve Corps, was an army corps of the German Wehrmacht during World War II. The formation was active between 1942 and 1944.

History 
The LXII Reserve Corps was formed on 15 September 1942 in Wehrkreis III (Berlin) for the purpose of leadership and organization of reserve divisions in Ukraine. It was a subordinate of the Wehrmachtbefehlshaber Ukraine staff between October 1942 and December 1943. The commander of the corps throughout its lifetime was Ferdinand Neuling, the former commander of the 239th Infantry Division.

Between 1 June 1943 and 3 December 1943, it consisted of the 143rd Reserve Division and the 147th Reserve Division.

The corps was redeployed on 15 January 1944 to Le Bourg-d'Oisans and renamed LXII. Armeekorps on 5 August 1944. The corps was destroyed on 18 August 1944 in Marseille and formally disbanded on 2 November 1944.

Structure

Noteworthy individuals 

 Ferdinand Neuling, commander of the LXII Reserve Corps and LXII Army Corps throughout its active time.

References 

Corps of Germany in World War II
Military units and formations established in 1942
Military units and formations disestablished in 1944